Cape Carteret may refer to:

 , a peninsula near Carteret, Normandy, France
 Cape Carteret, North Carolina, a town within Carteret County, North Carolina, U.S.A.